Hugh of Montgomery, 2nd Earl of Shrewsbury (died 1098), was an Anglo-Norman aristocrat and member of the House of Bellême. He was also known as Hugh the Red.

Life
He was the second surviving son of Roger de Montgomerie, 1st Earl of Shrewsbury of the House of Montgomerie, and Mabel de Bellême of the House of Belleme. As was typical of the first post-Conquest generation, he inherited most of his father's English possessions while his older brother Robert of Bellême inherited the vast lordship of Bellême. He was at the castle of Bures-sur-Dives in December 1079 when his mother was murdered and pursued the perpetrators but was unable to overtake them. In the summer of 1080, along with his brothers he attested a charter for the abbey of Troarn (Diocese of Bayeux) by their father "for the redemption of his soul and [those] of his relatives, and especially of his wife Mabel lately deceased; and of his sons".

In 1094 at his father's death he succeeded to his father's English titles and honors as well as his Welsh lands, as Earl of Shrewsbury. In 1095 he joined in the conspiracy of those supporting Robert de Mowbray against William Rufus. In 1096 he was pardoned by William Rufus after a fine of £3,000. During his four years as earl, he spent most of his time in the Welsh Marches fighting against the Welsh. In 1098, he joined forces with Hugh d'Avranches, 1st Earl of Chester in an attempt to recover Anglesey, which had been lost in the Welsh revolt of 1094.

On or about 31 July 1098 Hugh was killed at the Battle of Anglesey Sound while fighting against a raid by King Magnus Barefoot of Norway at Anglesey, being shot dead by an arrow and falling into the sea. Among those in Magnus' party were Harold Haroldson, son of Harold Godwinson King of England. Several sources agree that it was Magnus himself who shot the arrow hitting Hugh through the eye slit in his armor while the earl was riding carelessly through the shallows.

Succession

Hugh died unmarried, and his English lands and titles passed to his older brother Robert of Bellême, who became the 3rd Earl of Shrewsbury.

Notes

References

Additional references
 "Hugh (d. 1098)", in Dictionary of National Biography, 1885–1900, Volume 28.

11th-century births
1098 deaths
11th-century English nobility
Anglo-Normans in Wales
Normans killed in battle
Earls of Shrewsbury
Clan Montgomery